Disconnect from Desire is the second studio album by American indie rock band School of Seven Bells, released on July 7, 2010 by Vagrant Records and Ghostly International. It debuted at number 200 on the Billboard 200. A deluxe limited edition of the album was released in a box set containing 10 exclusive tarot cards and a bonus disc of alternate versions of the band's debut album Alpinisms.

Track listing

Personnel
Credits adapted from the liner notes of Disconnect from Desire.

School of Seven Bells
 Benjamin Curtis – recording, guitar, production, percussion, 
 Alejandra de la Deheza – lead vocals, guitar
 Claudia Deheza – backing vocals, synths

Additional personnel
 Bryan Collins – design
 Joe Corey – mixing assistance
 Tim DeLaughter – tubular bells 
 Toby Halbrooks – additional percussion 
 Mark Pirro – tubular bells recording 
 Jack Joseph Puig – mixing
 Nolan Thies – additional percussion recording

Charts

Release history

References

2010 albums
Full Time Hobby albums
Ghostly International albums
School of Seven Bells albums
Vagrant Records albums